William Thompson McElwain (May 14, 1903 – November 26, 1996) was an American football player and coach of football and basketball. McElwain played college football at Northwestern University and professionally in the National Football League (NFL) with the Chicago Cardinals and alongside Red Grange with the Chicago Bears. McElwain served as the head football coach at Ferris State College—now known as Ferris State University—in Big Rapids, Michigan from 1927 to 1939, compiling a record of 31–44–7. He was also the head basketball coach at Ferris State from 1927 to 1940, tallying a mark of 109–127.

Head coaching record

Football

References

External links
 

1903 births
1996 deaths
American football halfbacks
Basketball coaches from Illinois
Chicago Cardinals players
Ferris State Bulldogs athletic directors
Ferris State Bulldogs football coaches
Ferris State Bulldogs men's basketball coaches
Northwestern Wildcats football players
Players of American football from Chicago
Sportspeople from Chicago
Sportspeople from Evanston, Illinois